Peter English (born 1963) is a retired British boxer.

Boxing career
He represented England and won a silver medal in the 57 kg featherweight division, at the 1986 Commonwealth Games in Edinburgh, Scotland.

English boxed for the Gallagher Boys ABC and won the prestigious ABA featherweight championship in 1987.

He turned professional on 18 October 1988 and fought in 6 fights.

References

1963 births
Living people
British male boxers
Commonwealth Games medallists in boxing
Boxers at the 1986 Commonwealth Games
Commonwealth Games silver medallists for England
Featherweight boxers
Medallists at the 1986 Commonwealth Games